Ohne may refer to:

Õhne, a river of Estonia and Latvia
Ohne, Germany, a community in Lower Saxony, Germany
Ohne (Wipper), a river of Thuringia, Germany, tributary of the Wipper